Kristine Shakhkuliani (born 26 November 1998) is a Georgian footballer who plays as a defender and has appeared for the Georgia women's national team.

Career
Shakhkuliani has been capped for the Georgia national team, appearing for the team during the 2019 FIFA Women's World Cup qualifying cycle.

References

External links
 
 
 

1998 births
Living people
Women's footballers from Georgia (country)
Georgia (country) women's international footballers
Women's association football defenders
FC Martve players